Maeser may refer to:

 Karl G. Maeser, prominent member of the Church of Jesus Christ of Latter-day Saints 
 Maeser, Utah